Anthony J Sharpe (born 24 September 1974) is an Australian actor, producer and singer, best known for his role playing the character of Cecil Yates (Cec) on ABC1's Miss Fisher's Murder Mysteries. He grew up in Melbourne and became involved in acting after a lengthy career as a professional singer.

Early life
Born to parents Joy and Joe as the youngest of four children, Sharpe grew up on the family's small farm in Willowmavin, Victoria. Sharpe picked up his first guitar at the age of fifteen and fell into singing by accident, after filling in singing with a high school band.

After finishing an apprenticeship at Holdens Engine Company as a fitter and machinist, Sharpe left the company to pursue music full-time.  His band Heavy Human Traffic recorded three albums: Ritafind (1998), Heavy Human Traffic (1999), and Second Skin (2001). The group disbanded in 2003.

Sharpe began his acting career after working on stage for two years at Dracula's Theatre Restaurant in Melbourne.

Career
Sharpe appeared in small roles including Blue Heelers (2002), Neighbours (2005), City Homicide (2010) before landing the role of Cecil Yates (Cec) on ABC1's Miss Fisher's Murder Mysteries (2011). He appeared as Detective Foy in an episode in Wentworth in 2017.

Sharpe has worked in various Australian independent films including There's a Bluebird in My Heart (2015), Oh Brother (2017), 7 Storeys Down (2017), and Mutt (2018).

Filmography

Television

Films

Awards and nominations

Equity Awards

References

External links
 
 

1974 births
Australian male television actors
Male actors from Melbourne
Living people